Duvalo is an active geothermal surface feature situated close to the village of Kosel, near Lake Ohrid in the southwest of North Macedonia. Located at 740 metres above the sea level, it resembles a miniature crater with a diameter of 50 centimetres and a depth of 30 cm. Gaseous carbon dioxide and sulfur dioxide are released from the hole (therefore making it both a fumarole and a mofetta), and the smell of sulfur is said to be felt in a 3 kilometre radius around it. It represents the last traces of the historically significant volcanic activity in the area. During the Ottoman Empire it was used to mine sulfur.

On 28 May 2014 "significant amount of smoke" were emitted by the feature, a historic first.

See also
 Lists of volcanoes

References

External links
 Duvalo Page at the Natural History of the Republic of Macedonia site

Geology of North Macedonia
Ohrid Municipality
Volcanism of North Macedonia
Fumaroles